Röllbach is a river of Bavaria, Germany. It is a right tributary of the Main near Klingenberg am Main.

See also

List of rivers of Bavaria

References

Rivers of Bavaria
Rivers of Germany